Titanium Sponge Plant of India is located at Kerala Minerals and Metals Ltd (KMML), Chavara, Kollam district of Kerala. Titanium sponge plant is a manufacturing plant which produces titanium sponge, a material which has very useful applications in space programme and other strategic areas like aeronautics, light defence vehicles etc. The plant in India is the only one in the world which can undertake all the different activities of manufacturing aerospace grade titanium sponge under one roof. The material is an alloy product which is produced through Kroll process which includes leaching or heated vacuum distillation to make the metal almost 99.7% pure.

History
The importance of establishing the Titanium Sponge Plant was realised keeping in view of the country's huge demand and import of titanium and magnesium alloys from countries like China, Russia and Japan. Former President of India and scientist, Dr APJ Abdul Kalam highlighted about it in one of his speech at Kerala Legislative Assembly. The plant was fully commissioned in August 2015.

Establishment
The successful implementation has only been achieved after about twenty years of continuous research by the Defence Metallurgical Research Laboratory (DMRL under DRDO). The project is funded by Vikram Sarabhai Space Centre (VSSC under ISRO).

Ranking
India is the seventh country in the world to have such a complex structured TSP which has the technology to make titanium sponge and the first to have done all the process under one roof in indigenous manner. The company, Kerala Minerals and Metals Ltd. (KMML), has also won awards for commercialising  the technology.

Design and capacity
The plant has an intricate design to carry out realisation of Titanium alloy wrought products and fabrication of hardware. Work is being done actively to increase the capacity of the TSP for the proposed 10000 TPY. A memorandum of understanding has also been signed by the KMML with Steel Authority of India (SAIL) for a huge joint venture for preparing titanium sponge at large scale. India has the third largest reserves of Titanium containing minerals. India was also the sixth largest country by Titanium product in 2013. However, the high purity Titanium sponge(which has at least 99.7% Titanium) as raw material is still imported for aerospace applications from countries like Japan, Russia and China. VSSC realized the aerospace-grade alloy, having formula Ti6Al4V, at Mishra Dhatu Nigam (Midhani) in Hyderabad.

Future prospects
The proposals for future include magnesium recovery from MgCl2 (magnesium chloride) to set up an additional facility on similar lines. Proposals are also there to expand the capacity which is presently 500 MT to 1000 MT.

Applications 
The material produced by the plant is useful for liquid propellant tanks for launch vehicles, inter tank structures, gas bottle/liners and interface rings for satellites.

References

Manufacturing plants
Physics experiments
Titanium
Aerospace materials